The 1990 Danone Hardcourt Championships was a women's tennis tournament played on outdoor hard courts at the Milton Tennis Centre in Brisbane in Australia and was part of the Tier IV category of the 1990 WTA Tour. It was the fourth edition of the tournament and was held from 1 January through 7 January 1990. Sixth-seeded Natasha Zvereva won the singles title.

Finals

Singles

 Natasha Zvereva defeated  Rachel McQuillan 6–4, 6–0
 It was Zvereva's first singles title of her career.

Doubles

 Jana Novotná /  Helena Suková defeated  Hana Mandlíková /  Pam Shriver 6–3, 6–1
 It was Novotná's 1st doubles title of the year and the 15th of her career. It was Suková's 1st doubles title of the year and the 32nd of her career.

References

External links
 WTA tournament draws
 ITF tournament draws

Danone Hardcourt Championships
Danone Hardcourt Championships
Dan
Danone Hardcourt Championships, 1989
Danone Hardcourt Championships
Sports competitions in Brisbane
Tennis in Queensland